Primal Scream is the second studio album by Scottish rock band Primal Scream. It was released on 4 September 1989 in the United Kingdom by Creation Records and in the United States by Mercenary Records. Musically, it took a harder rock approach than their 1987 debut Sonic Flower Groove and did not achieve great success. However, the song "I'm Losing More Than I'll Ever Have" was later remixed to provide the breakthrough single "Loaded", which appeared on their much celebrated third album Screamadelica.

Critical reception

The album received mixed-to-positive reviews from music critics. Tim Sendra of AllMusic wrote: "While the group was capable of whipping up a credible approximation of thuggish hard rock, Bobby Gillespie's fragile wisp of a voice is rather ill-suited to kicking out the jams."

Track listing

Personnel
Credits adapted from liner notes.
Primal Scream
 Robert "Throb" Young – guitar
 Bobby Gillespie – vocals
 Andrew Innes – guitar
 Philip Tomanov – drums
Additional musicians
 Henry Olsen – bass, orchestration
 Martin Duffy – piano
Technical
Alan McGee - management
Jayne Houghton - cover photography

References

External links
 

1989 albums
Primal Scream albums
Creation Records albums